The 2011–12 season was Newport County's second consecutive season in the Conference National. The club finished the season in 19th place and were runners-up in the FA Trophy final at Wembley — their first visit to Wembley in the club's 100-year history.

Season review

League

2011
Manager Anthony Hudson's stated intention was to get Newport County back into the Football League. The season began in the best possible way at Kettering Town's new Nene Park ground with Elliot Buchanan putting County into a 1–0 lead after only six minutes. However hints of the season-to-come's struggles were evident when Kettering scored twice in the second half to lead 2–1. Danny Rose immediately equalised to leave the score 2–2 until Kettering were awarded a 90th-minute penalty. This was duly converted and County lost 3–2. The first home game against Hayes & Yeading was emphatically won 4–0, but thereafter began a run of 10 games without victory that cost Anthony Hudson his job. After draws against Grimsby Town and Ebbsfleet United County suffered five straight defeats including a televised 5–0 humiliation away at Mansfield Town that pushed County into the relegation zone. In each of the next three games County were on course for victory but succumbed to late goals. At home to Stockport County for the first time since August 1987 Danny Rose had given the home side a 30th-minute lead only for an 81st-minute equaliser for the visitors to deny Newport a win. In the next home game against Barrow County were 2–1 up going into injury time but again fell to a 90th-minute penalty, drawing 2–2. Away to Forest Green Rovers County were winning 1–0 only for former County player Charlie Griffin to equalise and yet another game was drawn. This was to prove to be Hudson's last game in charge. With a miserable return of only five points from their last ten games and County lying in last-but-one place in the table he was sacked the next day. Assistant manager Lee Harrison took charge for the next game away at Darlington who themselves were in a bad run of form, but County's miserable run continued. Two first half goals for the home side helped them to their first win in seven games with County remaining rooted in the relegation zone four points from safety. Justin Edinburgh was announced as the new manager on 4 October with the job of saving County from relegation. The enormity of the task was revealed in his first game in charge at home to Southport with three first-half goals condemning County to yet another defeat. The next game away to promotion hopefuls Fleetwood Town began with the home side taking the lead within 52 seconds. However a rout was avoided and against all the odds County eventually ran out 4–1 winners with Sam Foley scoring a hat-trick. This most unlikely of victories was only the second of 15 games so far in the season. After a 2–1 defeat at Tamworth revenge was extracted on Kettering Town in a 3–1 home victory with Danny Rose scoring a hat-trick. After a 0–0 draw at Wrexham and a 1–0 defeat at home to Ebbsfleet United County travelled to Blundell Park to face Grimsby Town. After being 2–0 up inside 17 minutes County again fell to late goals, with Serge Makofo scoring in the 79th minute and Anthony Elding converting an 87th-minute penalty. At home against Luton Town County looked on course to get a point from a 0–0 draw but yet again were undone by a late goal with Danny Crow scoring in the 2nd minute of stoppage time. In the next game at Woking's Kingfield Stadium County achieved a second 4–0 victory over Hayes & Yeading which finally lifted them out of the relegation zone on goal difference. This was followed the first visit of Lincoln City since the Third Division match of March 1986. This match was won 1–0 and County leapfrogged City into 18th place in the table. In the next game at home to 23rd-placed Alfreton Town County's record of conceding late goals continued. After leading from an Eliott Buchanan goal in the 4th minute County were 2–1 behind by the 28th minute. A Gary Warren equaliser in the 60th minute looked to have achieved a point for County, but an 89th-minute winner gave Alfreton just their second win in 14 games. With the proposed Boxing Day fixture at home to Bath City a victim of the weather the last game of 2011 was the home fixture against high-flying Fleetwood Town. Fleetwood maintained their charge at the top of the table with a 75th-minute winner but County saw out the end of the year outside the relegation zone.

2012
The new year began with the short away trip to bottom-placed Bath City. County again took an early lead through Nat Jarvis in the 13th minute but lost the game 3–2 to give Bath only their third victory of the season. That loss pushed County back to the brink of the relegation zone, only staying out on goal difference. Away to Luton Town County lost 2–0 after debutant Ryan Charles was sent off after 32 minutes. After a home 0–0 draw with Forest Green Rovers County made the long trip to Gateshead. Finding themselves 2–0 down after 53 minutes Elliot Buchanan pulled a goal back in the 57th minute. As the game drew to a close another County defeat looked likely. However County were awarded a penalty in the 90th minute. Sam Foley's spot-kick was initially saved but he was quick to tap in the rebound. The comeback was complete in the 94th minute when substitute Jake Harris scored a 20-yard winner. Despite the victory County had now slipped back into the relegation zone. County's next game saw a return to Stockport County's Edgeley Park for the first time since January 1988. Finding themselves 1–0 behind after just seven minutes Andy Sandell equalised in the 50th minute before being sent off just eight minutes later. After Daniel Rowe grabbed his second of the game just minutes later the hosts were back in front with Newport a man down. As the clock ticked towards full-time Jake Harris scored the equaliser in the 87th minute having only been on the pitch for nine minutes. The next game saw a 1–0 revenge victory at home over Bath City. County had now left the relegation zone and leapt four places to 17th in the table. The following game saw another 1–0 revenge victory, this time against high-flying Mansfield Town. That victory took County to 16th in the table – the highest they had been since August. In the next game away at Tamworth County took an early lead through a 6th-minute Sam Foley penalty. As the game entered the final minutes this looked to be the third straight County victory but Tamworth equalised in the 83rd minute. Two minutes later and the hosts had won it, the final score a 2–1 County defeat. After an away 1–1 draw at Southport County were at home to mid-table Braintree Town. After only seven minutes on the clock Lee Minshull was sent off. County eventually lost 4–3 having played 83 minutes of normal time and 12 minutes of stoppage time with only ten men. By this point in the season County knew they had made the FA Trophy Final at Wembley but were still in danger of relegation. Away at Cambridge United County trailed 1–0 until Andy Sandell scored a penalty five minutes from time to earn County a 1–1 draw. Next up was a first trip to Lincoln City's Sincil Bank since the Third Division encounter in October 1985. The game was lost 2–0 and County found themselves just one place and one point above the relegation zone. County achieved their second double of the season in the next game, beating Gateshead 1–0 at home, but were still only one place and one point above relegation. The next game was the first of the three encounters with promotion hopefuls York City. County won 2–1. The third home game in a week resulted in a 0–0 draw against Telford United to take seven points out of the nine available. Away to Kidderminster Harriers Jake Reid scored for County within 10 seconds of kick-off and Sam Foley doubled the lead on 36 minutes. With full-time approaching Elliot Buchanan gave away a penalty in the 86th minute. Substitute Nick Wright duly converted it and full-time was up. However, in a disastrous spell of injury time Wright scored Kidderminster's equaliser in the 93rd minute and then the winner in the 95th minute for his hat-trick. The next game was the second of three games against York City. County again started well with Nat Jarvis scoring in the 4th minute. York equalised in the 59th minute and the game ended a 1–1 draw. County now knew that they only needed a point against relegated Darlington to secure league safety barring some statistically improbable results elsewhere. That point came with a 0–0 draw. Any doubts that County were now safe were extinguished by the following 1–0 victory over Alfreton Town. Manager Justin Edinburgh had achieved his aim of avoiding relegation. The final two league games of the season, results now immaterial, were a home 1–0 loss to second-placed Wrexham and a 3–1 loss to Barrow.

Results summary

Results by round

Cup

FA Cup
County started this season's FA Cup in the 4th qualifying round at home to fellow Conference Premier team Braintree Town. The teams had previously met in the league when County had suffered their fifth straight defeat. This game provided a total of seven goals: The first came when former County loan player Ben Wright put the visitors ahead in the 9th minute. Sam Foley equalised for County in the 25th minute before Craig McAllister put the hosts ahead in the 54th minute. Andy Yiadom equalised for Braintree, making it 2–2 on 67 minutes before Nat Jarvis put County back ahead in the 76th minute. As the game entered the last five minutes it seemed likely that County would progress into the First Round proper for the first time since 2006, however Braintree equalised yet again with captain Kenny Davis' 20-yard strike in the 86th minute. With a replay looking inevitable Paul Rodgers won it for County in the 89th minute with a 45-yard cross that found its way into the visitor's net.

In the First Round County were drawn at home to Shrewsbury Town — the teams meeting again for the first time since County's Welsh Cup Final triumph in 1980. The televised match only provided the one goal and it was Shrewsbury who progressed into the Second Round courtesy of a Terry Gornell goal in the 41st minute.

FA Trophy
County's run in the FA Trophy started unremarkably with a home 0–0 draw with fellow Conference National side Forest Green Rovers. The replay was won 2–0 thanks to Craig McAllister's second goal of the season in the first half and a Darryl Knights strike in the second.

The twice-postponed second-round match away to Worksop Town finally went ahead on 24 January. County took the lead in the 59th minute, but conceded an equaliser in the 71st minute. In the 84th minute another replay looked likely, but substitute Jake Harris put County back in front having only been on the pitch for four minutes. In the final minute of the game Harris grabbed his second goal in his ten-minute spell on the pitch leaving the final score 3–1.

The third-round game against Carshalton Athletic was won 4–0. Sam Foley opened the scoring in the 4th minute, with Elliott Buchanan adding the second in the 35th minute.  Adam Chapman scored County's third just a minute after the second-half restart, with debutant Romone Rose getting the fourth in the 86th minute.

In the fourth round away to Northwich Victoria County found themselves 1–0 down after 26 minutes and 2–0 down after 47. Super-substitute Jake Harris was called for on 52 minutes and four minutes later County were back in the game as he scored to leave County trailing by only one goal. With six minutes of time remaining County looked to be out of the Trophy, but Harris struck again levelling the scores at 2–2. A replay would have been a fair result, but County won it in the 89th minute with Nat Jarvis heading the winner.

The opponents for the two-legged semi-final were 1985 FA Trophy winners Wealdstone. In the home leg County took the lead in the 7th minute as a half-clearance from Stones' 'keeper Jonathon North was headed straight at Elliot Buchanan, who chipped the ball back over him into the unguarded net. County's second goal came in the 21st minute: A Gary Warren header from a corner rebounded off the crossbar and Nat Jarvis was quickest to react to head home. Four minutes into the second half and the visitors were back in the game with Richard Jolley making the scoreline 2–1. County restored their two-goal advantage though in the 78th minute when Darryl Knights scored having only been on the pitch for three minutes.

County took their two-goal advantage into the second leg at Wealdstone, knowing that a win, a draw, or even a 1–0 defeat would be enough to get them to the final at Wembley. The final score of 0–0 was indeed enough and County were headed for their first ever visit to Wembley in 100 years.

Squad statistics
(Substitute appearances in brackets)

Transfers

In

Out

Loans in

Loans out

Fixtures and results

Pre-season friendlies

Conference National

FA Cup

FA Trophy

Final

Welsh Cup

League table

External links
 Newport County AFC 2011-2012 : Results 
 Newport County's results from season 2011/2012

References

2011-12
2011–12 Football Conference by team
Welsh football clubs 2011–12 season